Matthew Helders (born 7 May 1986) is an English drummer, vocalist and songwriter. He is best known as a founding member of the indie rock band Arctic Monkeys, with whom he has recorded seven studio albums.

In 2015, Helders collaborated with Iggy Pop and Queens of the Stone Age's Josh Homme and Dean Fertita to record Pop's studio album, Post Pop Depression (2016).

Career 
Helders has said that he ended up playing drums as "that was the only thing left. When we started the band none of us played anything. We just put it together. They all had guitars and I bought a drum kit after a bit." However, Helders has mentioned the influence rap music has had on the band, saying "We were rap fans at school more than now ... it still influences us in some ways; like for me, it's the drummin'. The groove element, like foon-keh music." In addition, Helders cites seeing Queens of the Stone Age as the biggest influence on his development as a drummer, saying "the one thing that changed me the most was seeing Queens of the Stone Age live at a festival ... as soon as they came off I was like – 'Fuck, I need to start hitting harder.'" Helders also explained the band's insistence on singing in their native Sheffield accent, saying, "when you talk between the songs at a gig and you're speakin' English in our normal accent, it seems a bit strange when you burst into song like you're from California or something ... it looks a bit daft."

In a similar fashion to other members of the band, Helders has remained true to his hometown roots, suggesting that seeing places all over the world makes him more appreciative of Sheffield, which still provides the basis for the band's lyrics. "And all around you, there's still plenty of things to write about. Touring lets you see a lot of places that you realise you wouldn't want to live in ... and when you come home, it's pretty easy to slip into your old ways, to all the places you've always gone." Helders also points out that despite the fame of the band, he can still avoid being mobbed in the street – "If we all go out together at night clubbing, it's difficult, but alone you don't get recognised much."

The most comprehensive backing vocalist of the group, his vocals have been featured on many of the band's songs. He often sings in response to or in harmony with lead singer Alex Turner, and sings lead vocals on "D Is for Dangerous", "Brick by Brick", and "I.D.S.T.", as well as on parts of "You Probably Couldn't See for the Lights but You Were Staring Straight at Me", "Who the Fuck Are Arctic Monkeys?" and "Teddy Picker". 

Helders prefers playing the drums wearing a comfortable pair of 'joggers' instead of jeans "due to movement and sweat." Helders says "You don't want to sweat in your jeans and wear them the next day. Some people will call that rock and roll. I just call it unhygienic."

Outside Arctic Monkeys 
In 2008, Helders remixed "T.H.E.H.I.V.E.S", the Hives's fourth single from The Black and White Album, and "Skin Divers", Duran Duran's second single from Red Carpet Massacre. He played a few TV shows with We Are Scientists in the UK as well as remixing their second single "Chick Lit" as a B-side for the vinyl release. He is featured on Toddla T's album Skanky Skanky. He remixed "Again & Again" for Roots Manuva, which gained airplay from Zane Lowe on BBC Radio 1.

In August 2008, it was announced that Helders would compile the latest release in the LateNightTales DJ mix CD series. The set, entitled Late Night Tales: Matt Helders, was released on 27 October 2008 and included a spoken work track performed and written by bandmate Alex Turner.

Helders recorded the drum tracks on Post Pop Depression, written by Iggy Pop and Josh Homme, which was released on 18 March 2016. Helders toured with them to support the album.

Helders played on American singer Lady Gaga's 2016 album Joanne.

In 2018, Helders produced for Milburn frontman Joe Carnall on his new project, released under the moniker Good Cop Bad Cop, with an eponymous album being released on 29 March 2019, and a tour following, although Helders himself wasn't present at any of the gigs.

Clothing line 
Helders released his own clothing line, consisting of a jacket, a zip hood and three T-shirts. The garments went on sale in May 2007 with sales accompanied by a CD featuring an Arctic Monkeys remix by Helders and Supremebeing designer Skuff. One pound from each sale was to go to the Arthur Rank Hospice.

Personal life 
Helders dated model Breana McDow from 2011. The couple became engaged in 2013 and married in 2016. In 2015, the couple had a daughter, Amelia Darling Helders. Helders lives in Los Angeles. In early 2019, he filed for divorce.

Discography
Arctic Monkeys

 Whatever People Say I Am, That's What I'm Not (2006)
 Favourite Worst Nightmare (2007)
 Humbug (2009)
 Suck It and See (2011)
 AM (2013)
 Tranquility Base Hotel & Casino (2018) 
 The Car (2022)

Albums
Late Night Tales: Matt Helders (2008)

Singles
"Dreamer" (featuring Nesreen Shah) (2008)

As producer
Good Cop Bad Cop – Good Cop Bad Cop (2019)

As featured performer
Mongrel – "Barcode" (featuring Pariz 1, Tor Cesay, Mpho, Saul Williams and Matt Helders) (2008)
Mongrel – "The Menace" (featuring Lowkey and Matt Helders) (2008)
Toddla T – "Boom Dj From The Steel City" (2009)
Toddla T – "Better" (2009)
Iggy Pop – Post Pop Depression (2016)
The Last Shadow Puppets – Everything You've Come to Expect (2016)
Lady Gaga – "Diamond Heart" (2016)
Good Cop Bad Cop – Good Cop Bad Cop (2019)
Remixes
The Hives – "We Rule The World (T.H.E.H.I.V.E.S.)" (2008)
We Are Scientists – "Chick Lit" (2008)
Roots Manuva – "Again & Again" (2008)
Duran Duran – "Skin Divers" (2008)
Yo Majesty – "Club Action" (2009)
Wet Nuns – "Don't Wanna See Your Face" (2011)
Paul Weller – "That Dangerous Age" (2011)

Filmography
"Scummy Man" (2006)

References 

Arctic Monkeys members
1986 births
Living people
English rock drummers
British male drummers
Musicians from Sheffield
21st-century drummers
Mongrel (band) members